Richard William Pfaff (1936-10 July 2016) was an American historian specializing in medieval English liturgy.

Biography 

He was a descendant of German settlers in the Midwest. In 1966, he was ordained a priest in the Episcopal Church.

Career 

He completed his B.A. in history at Harvard College. He later received the Rhodes scholarship and attended Magdalen College, Oxford, where he received his D.Phil in history. He served as a professor of history at the University of North Carolina Chapel Hill until his retirement in 2006.

Honors 

In 1993, he became a Fellow of the Society of Antiquaries of London.

Personal life
He was married to Margaret Campbell until her death in 2010; he then married Jeanette Falk shortly before his death.

Bibliography 
His notable books include:

 The Liturgy in Medieval England: A History. Cambridge: Cambridge University Press 2009.
 Liturgical Calendars, Saints and Services in Medieval England. (= Variorum collected studies series 610). Aldershot: Ashgate 1998.
 Medieval Latin Liturgy: A Select Bibliography (= Toronto Medieval Bibliographies 9). Toronto: University of Toronto Press 1982.
 New Liturgical Feasts In Later Medieval England (= Oxford theological monographs). Oxford: Clarendon Press 1970.

References

External links 

 News & Observer obituary (paywalled)
 ResearchGate

American historians
Alumni of the University of Oxford
1936 births
Harvard College alumni
University of North Carolina at Chapel Hill faculty
2016 deaths